The Deacon William Leland House is a historic house in Sherborn, Massachusetts.  It is a -story main dwelling, five bays wide, with a small ell to the west. It has a side gable roof with central chimney, and relatively simple trim.  The house was built in 1717 for Deacon William Leland, son of one of the area's first settlers, and has seen relatively little exterior alteration, unlike other early houses in the town.

The house was listed on the National Register of Historic Places in 1986.

See also
National Register of Historic Places listings in Sherborn, Massachusetts

References

Houses on the National Register of Historic Places in Middlesex County, Massachusetts
Houses in Sherborn, Massachusetts
Houses completed in 1717
Georgian architecture in Massachusetts